Lesia Ivanivna Nikitiuk (born 19 October 1987) is a Ukrainian TV presenter.

Biography 
Nikitiuk was born in Khmelnytskyi, Ukraine on 19 October 1987. Her mother is Kateryna Petrivna Nikitiuk and father is Ivan Ivanovich Nikitiuk, workers of "Ukrelectroapparat." After graduating from the school she received higher education at Khmelnytskyi Humanitarian Pedagogical Academy. During the training, she was a member of the KVN "Tornado Lux" team. The production of "Halia, I'm on the bus" has collected more than 4.2 million views on YouTube.

In 2009, with a close friend, Olga Panasenko began to perform in the "Curling show". Two years later, the two took part in the show Rozsmishi komika. They managed to impress humourists and earn ₴50,000, and then another ₴20,000. In the Russian programme "Rozsmishi komika" they earned ₽250,000.

From 2012 to 2013, was the host of TV show Oryol i Reshka.

In 2013, she hosted on the channel K1 the so-called author's program about the show-business "Lesia-Zdiesya".

On 8 February 2015, the 10th season of the Oryol i Reshka show began, in which Lesia Nikitiuk participated along with other colleagues on the show. On 17 August 2015, the second part of the "jubilee" season "Oryol i Reshka" came out on the air, where Lesia resumed hosting.

In 2015, Lesia Nikitiuk, together with Andrey Bednyakov, Regina Todorenko and Zhanna Badoeva, starred in the video Svetlana Loboda "Пора домой".

In 2015, Nikitiuk was nominated for the main Television Prize of the country "Teletriumf" as a leading entertainment program.

On December 10, 2015, Nikitiuk went on a round-the-world trip along with the TV program Oryol i Reshka.

On September 18, 2016, Nikitiuk was the presenter of "Navkolo M" project, where she is looking for the best men from around the world.

In February 2018, she became TV presenter of the new TV show Hto zverhu? on Novyi Kanal (co-hosting with Serhiy Prytula), and in August, became the host of resumed intellectual show Who is against blondes? on the same channel.

In 2018, she became a participant of the show Tantsi z zirkamy.

Filmography

Cinema

TV

Awards and nominations

References

External links 
 
 

Living people
1987 births
People from Khmelnytskyi, Ukraine
Ukrainian television presenters
Ukrainian women television presenters